Jack Craydon Haden (October 2, 1914 – January 25, 1996) was an American football tackle who played three seasons with the New York Giants of the National Football League. He played college football at the University of Arkansas and attended Central High School in Fort Worth, Texas.

References

External links
Just Sports Stats
 

1914 births
1996 deaths
Players of American football from Fort Worth, Texas
American football tackles
Arkansas Razorbacks football players
New York Giants players